Wandanooka is a small Aboriginal community in the Mid-West region of Western Australia, within the City of Greater Geraldton.

Native title 
The community is part of the Mallewa-Wadjury joint native title claim over the Tallering Peak Iron Ore area.

Governance 
The community is managed through its incorporated body, the Wandanooka Aboriginal Corporation, which was incorporated under the Commonwealth Aboriginal Councils and Associations Act 1976 on 28 July 1992.

Town planning 
Wandanooka town plan

References

Aboriginal communities in Mid West (Western Australia)